Two of Us is the fourth Japanese remix album by South Korean pop act Tohoshinki, and their first remix album as a duo. It was released on October 5, 2016, by Avex Trax. 

The album contains remixes of tracks from Tohoshinki's first four albums since becoming a duo—Tone (2011), Time (2013), Tree (2014), and With (2014). The music in the album is influenced by variations of 1950s to 1960s lounge music and soft rock, including surf music, bossa nova, Philly soul, and lovers rock.

Two of Us debuted at number two on the Oricon Albums Chart and Billboard Japan Top Albums Chart, selling 28,000 copies.

Background
Two of Us was announced on August 19, 2016 by Avex Trax through Tohoshinki's official website. The album was created while both members of Tohoshinki were fulfilling their compulsory service in South Korea.

Rather than mixing the songs into dance or club tracks, Tohoshinki and their label opted for a more "colorful" approach to the remixes. The theme of the album focuses on relaxing sounds throughout the day, and incorporates serene beach remix styles such as lounge music. The cover of Two of Us features a colorful painting of Tohoshinki, which is based on a series of photos that Tohoshinki shot for their "Sweat / Answer" single in 2014.

On September 2, Avex Trax released short snippets of "Baby, don't cry" and "OCEAN".

Track listing

Credits and personnel
Credits for Two of Us, taken from the liner notes of the album.

Tohoshinki – main vocals
Shinjiroh Inoue – music, arrangement, programming, mixer, recorder, guitar
Tsukiko Nakamura – vocals, music, guitar
Goro Ito – remixer, classical guitar, programming
Keita Ogawa – drums, percussion
Masayasu Tzboguchi – Rhodes piano
KONCOS – remixer
Taichi Furukawa – piano, drums, synthesizers
Hiroshi Sato – guitar
Gakuji "MABE" Matsuda – technical advisor, remixer, triangle, conga
Tsutomu Oikawa – mixer, recorder
Mamoru S – mixer, programming, guitar
Tsuyoshi Fujita – remixer, programming, electric guitar
Atsushi Hattori – mixer
Tadashi Iwamura – drums
Taizo Nakamura – bass
Gota Yashiki – remixer, programming, drums
Dub Maxer X – mixer
Mitsuhiro Tanigawa – recorder 
KOICHI from SAWAGI – remixer, piano
Yoichiro Kakizaki – programmer, remixer, piano, guitar
Kitaro Nakamura – bass
Obawo Nakajima – percussion
Kiyoto Konda – guitar
Tatsuya Morokaji – mixer, recorder
Eiichi Kogrey – remixer, drums, bass, recorder
George (MOP of HEAD) – remixer, piano, synthesizers, mixer, recorder
Mio Abe – violin
Akico Maruyama – violin
TSUTCHIE – mixer
Mastered by Yuka Koizumi
Illustrator: Hitoshi Kuroki
Booklet liner notes: Takashi Inomata
Art direction and design: Masaru Nakagawa

Charts

Weekly charts

Sales

References

2016 compilation albums
TVXQ albums
Avex Group compilation albums